Paremhat 21 - Coptic Calendar - Paremhat 23

The twenty-second day of the Coptic month of Paremhat, the seventh month of the Coptic year. In common years, this day corresponds to March 18, of the Julian Calendar, and March 31, of the Gregorian Calendar. This day falls in the Coptic Season of Shemu, the season of the Harvest.

Commemorations

Saints 

 The departure of Saint Joseph of Arimathea
 The departure of Saint Cyril, Bishop of Jerusalem
 The departure of Saint Michael, Bishop of Naqadah

References 

Days of the Coptic calendar